Trésor Mputu Mabi (born 10 December 1985) is a Congolese footballer who plays as a midfielder or striker for TP Mazembe and the DR Congo national team.

He has been described by former Cameroon and DR Congo coach Claude Le Roy as being "the next Samuel Eto'o", whom he picked for the 1998 World Cup in France as a 17-year-old.

Club career
Mputu joined TP Mazembe in 2002, and has been a pivotal figure in the club's success ever since. In 2007, he helped his club reach the African Champions League by becoming the top goalscorer of the competition with nine strikes, and the Confederation Cup.

In 2009 and 2010 he captained Mazembe to back to back CAF Champions League titles. Through the years Mputu has been linked with several European clubs and trialled with Arsenal in 2007.

In July 2016, Mputu rejoined his old club TP Mazembe.

Suspension and return
In August 2010, Mputu received a 12-month global ban following his aggressive actions toward a referee during a match between TP Mazembe and Rwandan army side APR FC. Upon his return to action after a year on the sidelines, it took him just 46 seconds to find the net for his club against rivals TS Malkesa.

International career
Mputu made his international debut in 2004 and has been a regular in the squad since. He represented his country at the 2006 African Cup of Nations tournament, and was captain of the Congolese national team, leading the side in the 2013 African Cup of Nations tournament in South Africa. In their first game of the tournament, Mputu scored for the Congolese in the 2-2 draw against pre-tournament favourites Ghana.

He was recalled to the national team in November 2018, following a five-year absence.

Career statistics

Club

International

Scores and results list DR Congo's goal tally first, score column indicates score after each Mputu goal.

Honours
Individual
CAF Team of the Year: 2009
Glo-CAF's Best African Player on the continent: 2009
IFFHS World's Top Goal Scorer: 2007
African Nations Championship player of the tournament: 2009
BBC African Footballer of the Year: 2009 (nominated)

References

External links

Mputu glittering again for Mazembe
Mputu returns

1985 births
Living people
Footballers from Kinshasa
Democratic Republic of the Congo footballers
Association football forwards
Association football midfielders
Democratic Republic of the Congo international footballers
2006 Africa Cup of Nations players
2013 Africa Cup of Nations players
2019 Africa Cup of Nations players
Linafoot players
Kabuscorp S.C.P. players
TP Mazembe players
Democratic Republic of the Congo expatriate footballers
Democratic Republic of the Congo expatriate sportspeople in Angola
Expatriate footballers in Angola
2009 African Nations Championship players
Democratic Republic of the Congo A' international footballers